The ZF 4HP24 is a four-speed automatic transmission for passenger cars from ZF Friedrichshafen AG.  Introduced in 1987, it was used in a variety of cars from Audi, BMW, Jaguar, and Land Rover.

Applications

4HP24
1986–1994 BMW E32 750i M70/B50
1986–1994 BMW E32 750iL M70/B50
1986–1994 Jaguar XJ40
1989–1994 BMW E31 850Ci M70/B50
1989–1994 BMW E31 850i M70/B50
1989–1996 Jaguar XJS 4.0
1995–1997 Jaguar XJ6 (X300) 4.0
1994–2002 Range Rover V8 4.6L
1999–2002 Range Rover V8 4.0L
2003–2004 Land Rover Discovery V8 4.6L

4HP24A
Audi version
1990–1991 Audi V8 3.6 V8
1992–1994 Audi V8 4.2 V8
1994–1996 Audi D2 A8 4.2 V8 quattro
1995–1997 Audi S6 4.2 V8 C4 100

See also
List of ZF transmissions

References

4HP24